Agrioglypta buxtoni is a moth in the family Crambidae. It is found on Samoa.

References

Moths described in 1935
Spilomelinae
Moths of Oceania